A Charmed Life is a 1955 novel written by the American novelist Mary McCarthy.

Setting
A Charmed Life takes place in the small New England town of New Leeds (presumably on Cape Cod), where "everyone is artistic, but no one is an artist."

Characters
 Martha Sinnott: Martha was once married to Miles Murphy. He threw her out of the house during a feud one night, so she went to her neighbor's, the home of John Sinnott. She fell in love with and married him. She is working on a play.
 John Sinnott: John is a sensitive and loving individual. He marries Martha after she divorces Miles, and is very supportive of Martha's writing career.
 Jane Coe: Jane is a real estate agent in New Leeds. She comes from a wealthy family.
 Warren Coe: Warren is an artist. It is a town joke that he is constantly trying to incorporate the '4th dimension' (time) into his paintings. The Coes are considered the only normal couple in New Leeds.
 Miles Murphy: Miles is a very pompous and self-important character. He is definitely the most obvious villain in the story. Despite his wickedness, which most everyone recognizes, he is also admired for his intellect. It is said that he once studied under Carl Jung.
 Helen Murphy: Helen is Miles' trophy wife. She comes from a wealthy Greek family.
 Dolly Lamb: Dolly is Martha's cousin and confidante; a new resident in New Leeds.

Plot
The story begins with the simple trials and tribulations of everyday life experienced by John and Martha Sinnott. Their background stories are gradually introduced, especially during their picnic with the Coes in the beginning. One night when John is away, Martha and Miles drunkenly have sex at Martha's house after a party at the Coes'. Martha becomes pregnant, and rather than having a baby whose paternity is ambiguous, she decides to have an abortion. Warren lends Martha the money to have an abortion. The story ends with Martha dying in a car accident on her way home from the Coes' house, with the money for the abortion and the address of the clinic in her pocketbook.

Author 
Mary McCarthy (born June 21, 1912, Seattle, Wash., U.S.—died Oct. 25, 1989, New York, N.Y.) was an essayist, author, and critic known for writing on political, moral, and intellectual dilemmas through the use of humor and acerbity.

References

External links
 The Coveted Escape, The New York Times, November 6, 1955

1955 American novels
Novels by Mary McCarthy
Novels set on Cape Cod and the Islands